General Gustaf Fredrik Oskar Uggla (22 January 1846 – 7 January 1924) was a senior Swedish Army officer. Uggla's senior commands include commanding officer of the Military Academy Karlberg, executive officer of Svea Life Guards and commander of the 2nd Army Division. He also served as Chief of His Majesty's Military Staff from 1910 to 1924.

Early life
Uggla was born on 22 January 1846 at Säffle seat farm in By socken, Säffle Municipality, Värmland County, Sweden, the son of the major Carl Uggla (1796–1863) and his wife Lovisa (Louise) Regina, née Örn (1814–1877).

Career

Military career
Uggla was commissioned as an officer in Värmland Regiment in 1863 with the rank of underlöjtnant. In 1870 he was appointed general staff officer and in 1873 became a lieutenant in the then newly established General Staff (a corps he came to belong to – with the exception of the years 1879-81, when he served in Värmland Regiment and at the same time was company commander at the Royal Military Academy – until he became colonel in 1897). Uggla served as a teacher at the Royal Military Academy from 1877 to 1883 and he became captain of the General Staff in 1878 and in Värmland Regiment in 1879.

He then served as a military attaché in Vienna from 1883 to 1885 and from 1885 to 1890, Uggla served as a teacher at the Royal Swedish Army Staff College and in 1890 he was promoted to lieutenant colonel in the General Staff. Uggla was commander of the Royal Military Academy from 1890 to 1897 when he was promoted to colonel and appointed Executive Officer of Svea Life Guards. Five years later, in 1902, he was promoted to major general and appointed commander of the 2nd Army Division (II. arméfördelningen). In 1908, Uggla was promoted to lieutenant general and in 1913 he retired from active service and was promoted to full general in the reserve. In 1915, Uggla served as Acting Inspector of the Swedish Army Service Troops.

Service at the Royal Court
Already in 1871, Uggla had been appointed ordinance officer with the then Duke of Östergötland, later King Oscar II, whose staff he as ordinance officer, aide-de-camp and chief aide-de-camp then belonged to during the king's lifetime. In 1910, Uggla was appointed First Aide-de-Camp and Chief of His Majesty's The King Gustaf V's Military Staff. He was dismissed from office on 28 December 1923 and died 10 days later.

Other work
Uggla has been secretary, member and chairman of a number of military committees and commissions, including the Committee for the Examination of the Service Branches Exercise Regulations (Kommittén för granskning af de särskilda vapenslagens exercisreglementen) 1885–87, the Conscription Committee (Värnpliktskommittén) 1898, the Infantry Exercise Regulations Committees (Infanteriexercisreglementskommittéerna) 1893–95, 1902–04 and 1912 as well as in the Commission for Inquiry and More Concerning the Regiment Pastor Institution (Kommissionen för utredning m. m. rörande regementspastorsinstitutionen) in 1907.

Also a close friend of the voluntary shooting movement, Uggla was elected chairman of the Central Board of the National [Swedish] Rifle Clubs (Skytteförbundens överstyrelse) in 1909. As such, he has made a special contribution in terms of the development of field shooting activities in a direction that was beneficial to Sweden's defense. For many years he was a member of the board of the Swedish Central Association for Sports Promotion (Centralföreningen för idrottens främjande) and of the Swedish Red Cross. From 1898 to 1902 he was a member of the Martial Court of Appeals (Krigshovrätten). For a short time during the 1919 parliamentary term, he was the representative of Värmland County in Första kammaren. Uggla has also worked as a military writer. In addition to annual reports in the Krigsvetenskapsakademiens Handlingar och Tidskrift, he published Kriget mellan Tyskland och Frankrike 1870 och 1871 (together with G. Kleen och A. Malmborg, 1872), Handledning vid studiet af krigskonsten (1878–80) and a work dealing with the historical development of the war constitution and warfare (1885), and he wrote a section of 1818–1918. Minnesskrift med anledning af k. högre Artilleriläroverkets och Krigshögskolans på Marieberg samt Artilleri- och Ingenjörhögskolans etthundraåriga tillvaro (1918).

Uggla also served as chairman in the Executive Board of the Konungens hospital ("King's Hospital") in 1913 and in the life insurance company Balder.

Personal life
Uggla married on 9 January 1875 to Augusta Eleonora von Post (5 April 1851 in Frösåker – 26 January 1921 in Solna), the daughter of till captain Carl Rangel von Post (1811–1876) and Baroness Elisabeth (Betty), née Cronstedt (1813–1875).

He was the father of: Carl Gustafsson (born 1875); Louise (born 1877); Eva Thurinna (born 1879); Gustaf Gustafsson (born 1880); Elsa (born 1882); Signe (born 1883); Axel (born 1888); Bertil Gustafsson (born 1890); Thorsten Gustafsson (born 1892) and Bengt Gustafsson (1894–1937).

Death

Uggla died on 7 January 1924 in Stockholm. He was interred on 12 January 1924 at Solna Cemetery.

Dates of rank
1863 – Underlöjtnant
1873 – Lieutenant
1878 – Captain
1886 – Major
1890 – Lieutenant colonel
1897 – Colonel
1902 – Major general
1908 – Lieutenant general
1913 – General

Awards and decorations

Swedish
  Knight and Commander of the Orders of His Majesty the King (Order of the Seraphim) (30 September 1914)
  Knight of the Order of the Sword (30 November 1883)
  Commander Second Class of the Order of the Sword (18 September 1897)
  Commander First Class of the Order of the Sword (30 November 1901)
  Commander Grand Cross of the Order of the Sword (6 June 1909)
  King Oscar II's Jubilee Commemorative Medal (18 September 1897)
  King Oscar II and Queen Sofia's Golden Wedding Medal (1907)
  King Gustaf V's Olympic Commemorative Medal (1912)

Foreign
  Knight First Class of the Order of the Zähringer Lion (20 September 1881)
  Commander of the Order of the Zähringer Lion (June 1889)
  Commander Second Class of the Order of the Zähringer Lion (at the latest in 1905)
  Grand Cross of the Order of the Zähringer Lion (1911)
  Knight of the Order of the Dannebrog (2 February 1877)
  Grand Cross of the Order of the Dannebrog (1 June 1913)
  Grand Cross of the Order of the White Rose of Finland (1919)
  Knight Grand Cross of the Order of Saints Maurice and Lazarus (1911)
  Knight of the Order of St. Olav (1 December 1886)
  Commander First Class of the Order of St. Olav (23 October 1903)
  Grand Cross of the Order of St. Olav (29 November 1917)
  Knight Third Class of the Order of the Red Eagle (April 1885)
  Knight Second Class of the Order of the Red Eagle (July 1895)
  Knight First Class of the Order of the Red Eagle (1908)
  Grand Cross of the Order of the Red Eagle (August 1911)
  Knight First Class of the Order of Saint Anna (May 1908)
  Commander of the Order of Leopold (19 February 1900)
  Commander Second Class of the Order of Adolphe of Nassau (July 1889)
  Commander of the Order of Christ (1901)
  Commander of the Order of the Crown (April 1885)
  Third Class of the Order of Osmanieh (April 1885)
  Knight First Class of the Saxe-Ernestine House Order (12 April 1873)
  Knight Second Class of the Order of Military Merit of Waldeck-Pyrmont (18 September 1897)
  Knight Third Class of the Order of the Iron Crown (1 April 1885)

Honours
Member of the Royal Swedish Academy of War Sciences (26 October 1886)

Bibliography

References

1846 births
1924 deaths
Swedish Army generals
People from Säffle Municipality
19th-century Swedish military personnel
20th-century Swedish military personnel
Members of the Första kammaren
Members of the Royal Swedish Academy of War Sciences